Millard Johnson may refer to:

 Millard Johnson (Macross), a character in the Macross anime franchise
 Millard Johnson (producer), Australian film producer and exhibitor